Trollsletta is a coastal plain on the North Arctic Ocean island of  Jan Mayen. 

It is located on the eastern coast and  southern side of the island (Sør-Jan). It is inside the southwestern part of the bay Rekvedbukta, between Båtvika and Helenesanden. Trollsletta has a length of about 1,400 meters. The coast consists of low and splintered cliffs.  Olonkinbyen is located at Trollsletta. The only settlement on Jan Mayen, Olonkinbyen consists of a weather station and the Norwegian Armed LORAN-C station.

References

Landforms of Jan Mayen
Plains of Norway